Whizz is a 1994 isometric platform game released for the Amiga, Amiga CD32, and DOS. In 1996, it was ported to the Super NES and in 1997 to the PlayStation and Sega Saturn. A  Sega Mega Drive version was planned but never released. Within the game, "Whizz" refers to the player character's magical talents, being short for "wizard". Marketing for the game used it in reference to the slang term for urination, such as in the advertising slogan "Ever feel the need for a Whizz real bad? You will."

Reception
Coach Kyle gave the Super NES version a negative review in GamePro, criticizing the average graphics, "bland hero who definitely needs some personality", and most especially the isometric perspective, which he said makes jumping onto platforms and avoiding enemies frustratingly difficult.

References

External links
Whizz at Lemon Amiga
Whizz at GameFAQs

1994 video games
Amiga games
Cancelled Sega Genesis games
Amiga CD32 games
DOS games
Platform games
PlayStation (console) games
Sega Saturn games
Super Nintendo Entertainment System games
Video games about rabbits and hares
Video games developed in the United Kingdom
Video games with isometric graphics
Flair Software games
Single-player video games
Konami games